is a Japanese volleyball player who plays for Panasonic Panthers.

Clubs
  
  University of Tsukuba
  Panasonic Panthers (2008–present)

Awards

Individuals
 2007-08 Men's V.Premier League – "Best Libero"
 2008: 57th Kurowashi Tournament – "Best Libero"
 2009-10 Men's V.Premier League – "Best Libero"
 2010: 59th Kurowashi Tournament – "Best Libero"
 2010-11 Men's V.Premier League – "Best Libero" and "Best Receiver"
 2011-12 Men's V.Premier League – "Best Libero" and "Best Receiver"
 2012-13 Men's V.Premier League – "Best Libero" and "Best Receiver"
 2013: 62nd Kurowashi Tournament – "Best Libero"
 2014: 63rd Kurowashi Tournament – "Best Libero"

Team
 2008 Kurowashiki All Japan Volleyball Championship –  Champion, with Panasonic Panthers.
 2008-09 V.Premier League –   3rd place, with Panasonic Panthers.
 2009 Kurowashiki All Japan Volleyball Championship –  Champion, with Panasonic Panthers.
 2009-10 V.Premier League –  Champion, with Panasonic Panthers.
 2010 Kurowashiki All Japan Volleyball Championship –  Champion, with Panasonic Panthers.
 2010 Asian Club Championship –  3rd place, with Panasonic Panthers.
 2010-11 V.Premier League – 4th place, with Panasonic Panthers.
 2011-12 V.Premier League –  Champion, with Panasonic Panthers.
 2012 Kurowashiki All Japan Volleyball Championship –  Champion, with Panasonic Panthers.
 2012-13 V.Premier League –  Runner-Up, with Panasonic Panthers.
 2013 Kurowashiki All Japan Volleyball Championship –  Runner-Up, with Panasonic Panthers.
 2013-14 V.Premier League –  Runner-Up, with Panasonic Panthers.
 2014 Kurowashiki All Japan Volleyball Championship –  Champion, with Panasonic Panthers.

National team

Senior Team
 2009 Asian Championship –  Gold Medal
 2010 World Championship – 13th place
 2010 Asian Games –   Gold Medal
 2011 World Cup – 10th place
 2011 Asian Championship – 5th place
 2013 World Grand Champions Cup – 6th place
 2013 World League – 18th place
 2013 Asian Championship – 4th place
 2014 World League – 19th place
 2014 Asian Games –   Silver Medal

References

External links
 official profile
 Panasonic Panthers Player Profiles

1985 births
Japanese men's volleyball players
Living people
People from Western Tokyo
Asian Games medalists in volleyball
Volleyball players at the 2010 Asian Games
Volleyball players at the 2014 Asian Games
Asian Games gold medalists for Japan
Asian Games silver medalists for Japan
Medalists at the 2010 Asian Games
Medalists at the 2014 Asian Games
21st-century Japanese people